Shaunda Ikegwuonu (born 11 March 1998) is a field hockey player from Belgium, who plays as a forward.

Career

Club hockey
In the Belgian Hockey League, Ikegwuonu plays club hockey for the Braxgata.

International hockey

Under–18
In 2015 and 2016, Shaunda Ikegwuonu was a member of the Belgium U–18 team at the EuroHockey Youth Championship. At both the 2015 and 2016 tournaments, Belgium finished in fourth place, losing to England on each occasion.

Under–21
Following appearances for the national youth team, Ikegwuonu made her debut for the Belgium U–21 side in 2016, at a four nations tournament in Bad Kreuznach. Later that year, she went on to appear at an invitational tournament in Valencia.

In 2017, she won a silver medal at the EuroHockey Junior Championship in Valencia.

Ikegwuonu made her final appearance with the junior team in 2019, captaining the team to a fourth-place finish at the EuroHockey Junior Championship, again in Valencia.

Red Panthers
Shaunda Ikegwuonu made her senior international debut for Belgium in 2017 at the International Olive Oil Tournament in Jaén.

Her most recent appearance with the national team was during the 2020–21 FIH Pro League.

International goals

References

External links
 
 

1998 births
Living people
Female field hockey forwards
Belgian female field hockey players
20th-century Belgian women
21st-century Belgian women